Algeria and Poland are members of the Union for the Mediterranean and the United Nations. Both nations established diplomatic relations in 1962.

History
19th-century Polish poet Cyprian Norwid dedicated his poem Do Emira Abd El-Kadera w Damaszku to Emir Abdelkader, Algerian leader against French invasion.

Poles and Algerians both fought against Nazi Germany in World War II, including in the Battle of Monte Cassino in 1944. Algerian prisoners of war were held by the Germans alongside Polish and other Allied POWs in the Stalag II-B and Stalag VIII-C POW camps, operated in Czarne and Żagań, respectively. Both Algerian and Polish POWs were subjected to poor conditions resulting in high mortality.

Modern relations
Poland sent a rescue squad to help the relief operation after the 2003 Boumerdès earthquake in Algeria, and the Polish Medical Mission sent medical supplies.

Poland and Algeria enjoy a significant relations in business. In 2016, Poland and Algeria abolished visa requirements for diplomatic passport holders.

The Polish foreign minister had paid visit to Algeria in 2017 to boost trade and cooperation between two countries. Algerian Minister Mustapha Gitouni also boosts energy cooperation with Poland.

Algeria considers Poland as an important partner in Europe.

Resident diplomatic missions
 Algeria has an embassy in Warsaw.
 Poland has an embassy in Algiers.

See also 
 Foreign relations of Algeria
 Foreign relations of Poland
 Algeria–European Union relations

References

External links
Algerian Embassy in Poland 
Embassy of the Republic of Poland in Algeria 

 
Poland
Bilateral relations of Poland